Jeffrey Bent may refer to:
Jeffery Hart Bent (1781–1852), first judge in New South Wales, Australia
Geoff Bent (1932–1958), English footballer who died in the Munich air disaster